Benjamin Robertson "Ben" Harney (March 6, 1872 – March 2, 1938) was an American songwriter, entertainer, and pioneer of ragtime music. His 1896 composition "You've Been a Good Old Wagon but You Done Broke Down" is the second ragtime composition to be published and the first ragtime hit to reach the mainstream. The first Ragtime composition published was La Pas Ma La written by Ernest Hogan in 1895. It has been disputed by many historians on whether or not, "You've Been a Good Old Wagon but You Done Broke Down" was release in late 1895 or early 1896. On the front cover of "You've Been a Good Old Wagon but You Done Broke Down" , its listed as being copyrighted on 1895. However on the first page, its listed as being copyrighted in 1896.  During the early years of Harney's career, he falsely promoted himself as being the inventor of ragtime and never acknowledged the genre's black origin. Many contemporary musicians criticized him for it. Although ragtime is now probably more associated with Scott Joplin, in 1924 The New York Times wrote that Ben Harney "Probably did more to popularize ragtime than any other person." Time magazine called him "Ragtime's Father" in 1938.

Life and career

Ben Harney is generally said to have been born in Louisville, Kentucky. Although some sources put his birthplace as Nashville, Tennessee, according to his father's military records he was born in Memphis, Tennessee. In the past some have claimed that Harney was African-American and early in his career he is said to have played with African-American theater troupes. But, W.C. Handy referred to him as "white". All photographic and contemporary accounts show that Harney was light skinned with red hair. He married and lived in white society and always represented himself as White. Furthermore his well-documented family background conclusively proves his ethnicity. Harney was the son of Benjamin Mills Harney, a veteran of both the Mexican–American War and the Civil War, and his second wife Margaret Wellington Draffin, daughter of a prominent Kentucky lawyer. His grandfather was John Hopkins Harney, the first mathematics professor at Indiana University and author of the first algebra textbook ever published in the United States. His uncle William Wallace Harney was a renowned journalist and author. He counted two prominent U.S. generals as distant cousins: Lew Wallace and William Selby Harney.

Harney's tunes "You've Been a Good Old Wagon but You Done Broke Down", "Mister Johnson, Turn Me Loose", and "Cake Walk In The Sky" were big hits in the late 1890s. In 1896, the cover of Ben Harney's song "You've Been a Good Old Wagon but You Done Broke Down",  stated that Harney was the "Original Introducer to the Stage of the Now Popular 'Rag Time' in Ethiopian Song." This was one of the earliest known references to ragtime on sheet music and some sources have regarded the composition  as being the first published rag. The sheet music version of "Cake Walk in the Sky" provided the first written out example of vocal ragging (early scat). A recording of Harney singing "The Wagon" (see below), although recorded many years later, in 1925, fits early accounts of Harney's, then, very remarkable vocal style and suggests that Harney was singing very authentic sounding blues back in the 1890s. "Cake Walk in the Sky" was published by M. Witmark & Sons in New York in 1899. On the cover to the sheet music, "Cake Walk in the Sky" is described as a "March A La Ragtime" and as "A Rag-Time Nightmare".

In January 1896 Harney moved to New York City, where he appeared regularly at Tony Pastor's Music Hall. That same year Harney was referred to in print as "the rag time pianist". Harney's appearances in New York, such as at the Weber and Fields Music Hall, the Metropolitan Opera House, and Tony Pastor's Music Hall, promoting ragtime music, did much to create widespread popular and commercial enthusiasm for ragtime as a new genre of American music. He also organized and directed a variety show called Ragtime Reception.

In 1897 Harney published his book Ben Harney's Rag Time Instructor, the first description of how to rag: how to improvise rag time music by syncopating unsyncopated popular tunes. His Rag Time Instructor was arranged by ragtime composer Theodore H. Northrup and included written-out examples of "ragged" popular tunes including light classics and opera songs.

Also in 1897, Harney married Edyth Murray of Streator, Illinois. They later divorced, and he married an actress, Jessie Boyce, whose stage name was Jessie Haynes.

Harney toured widely on the vaudeville circuits in the United States, as well as tours of theaters in Europe and Asia, Australasia and the South Pacific. Once ragtime became popular he started billing himself as The Originator of Ragtime or The Father of Ragtime, which most (but not all) of his contemporaries thought was an overstatement for the sake of advertising. Harney's act included him ragging tunes at the piano, scat singing, and dancing. Theatrical photographs from his Australasia tour (1911) show him dancing in blackface.

Harney quit touring after suffering from a heart attack in 1928.

Ben Harney died of a heart attack at the age of 66 in Philadelphia, Pennsylvania in 1938. In an appreciation that appeared in Time magazine on March 14, 1938, a week after his death, he was described as "Ragtime's Father". Time wrote that "the first man to write ragtime down on paper was a slick-haired Kentuckian, Ben Harney."

Compositions
Ben Harney's compositions included:

1890s
"The Sporting Life is Sure Killing Me"
"Tomahau"
"Wissahickon"
1896
"You've Been a Good Old Wagon but You Done Broke Down", arranged by Johnny Biller
"Mister Johnson, Turn Me Loose"
"I Love My Honey"
1897
"There's A Knocker Layin' Around"
"You May Go, but This Will Bring You Back"
"Ben Harney's Ragtime Instructor", arranged by Theodore H. Northrup
1898
"Draw That Color Line: A Decision of Color"
"If You Got Any Sense You'll Go"
1899
"The Hat He Never Ate", with Howard S. Taylor
1899
"The Cake Walk in the Sky: Ethiopian Two Step", arranged by F.W. Meacham
"The Cake Walk in the Sky: Song"
"Tell it to Me: A Coontown Expression"
"I Love My Little Honey", arranged by W.H. Mackie
"The Black Man's Kissing Bug: An Interrupted Osculation in Darktown"
"I Love One Sweet Black Man"
1901
"The Only Way to Keep A Gal is to Keep Her in a Cage"
"I'd Give a Hundred if the Gal Was Mine"
1902
"T.T.T." ("Treat, Trade or Travel")
1913
"There's Only One Way to Keep a Gal", arranged by W. R. Dorsey
1914
"Cannon Ball Catcher"
1925
"The Wagon", recorded by Harney on a phonograph cylinder, U.S. Library of Congress

Listen 

While Harney was neglected by commercial recording studios during his lifetime, in 1925 a folklorist, Robert Winslow Gordon, recorded Harney singing an example of an early ragtime or rag-blues song, "The Wagon", on a dictaphone phonograph cylinder, and this recording has survived. Harney stated on the recording: "This is absolutely the first song published in ragtime; the first song ever written in ragtime. The idea was conceived by Ben Harney, in Louisville, Kentucky."

References

External links 

Benjamin Robertson Harney, "Father of Ragtime"
Ben Harney In Context
Ben Harney sheet music 01
Ben Harney sheet music 02
Ben Harney on Victor Records
Ben Harney at the Library of Congress 
MIDI file of "You've Been a Good Old Wagon

1872 births
1938 deaths
People from Memphis, Tennessee
Ragtime composers
Ragtime pianists
Songwriters from Tennessee
Vaudeville performers